Amanita austroviridis, commonly known as the Australian verdigris lepidella, is a species of agaric fungus in the family Amanitaceae native to Australia.

External links

austroviridis
Fungi native to Australia
Fungi described in 1992